The 1989 Tiananmen Square protests and massacre were student-led demonstrations in Beijing and the government response in 1989.

Tiananmen Square protests or Tiananmen Square incident may also refer to:
"Tank Man", an anonymous protester who blocked tanks leaving Tiananmen Square in 1989
Tiananmen Square protest of 4 May 1919, a protest that grew into the May Fourth Movement
1976 Tiananmen Incident, a spontaneous protest of 4–5 April 1976
Tiananmen Square self-immolation incident, a 2001 incident allegedly involving Falun Gong practitioners

Tiananmen Square